The Bernard Revel Graduate School of Jewish Studies was Yeshiva University’s first graduate school. Founded in 1937, it was named for Yeshiva University's first president, Bernard Revel. Its curriculum prepares highly trained teachers, researchers, and scholars in Jewish studies and emphasizes the critical analysis of primary sources, studies in methodology, and extensive readings in secondary literature.

Arthur Hyman was replaced as Revel’s dean by David Berger, though he maintains the position of Distinguished Service Professor of Philosophy.

Academics 
The School offers the following degree programs:
 M.A. in Bible, Medieval Jewish History, Modern Jewish history, Jewish Philosophy, and Talmudic Studies
 Ph.D. in Jewish Studies with concentrations in Bible, Jewish History, Jewish Philosophy, and Talmudic Studies
 joint B.A./M.A. program for Yeshiva University undergraduates

The Harry Fischel School for Higher Jewish Studies, established in 1945, offers the Revel program during the summer, with courses taught by distinguished visiting scholars, many from Israeli universities.

Facilities 
Classes are held at Yeshiva University’s Wilf Campus in New York City’s Washington Heights neighborhood. Facilities include the Mendel Gottesman Library, with comprehensive research collections (some 200,000 volumes strong) in Jewish studies. The library is also a member of METRO and the New York Area Theological Library Association.

External links
 Bernard Revel Graduate School of Jewish Studies

Yeshiva University
Educational institutions established in 1937
Jewish studies research institutes
1937 establishments in New York City